John or Johnny Hines may refer to:

Military
John L. Hines (1868–1968), Chief of Staff of the US Army
John Hines (Australian soldier) (1878–1958), British-born Australian soldier during World War I
John L. Hines Jr. (1905–1986), officer in the United States Army

Sports
John Hines (baseball) (1901–1967), American Negro league baseball player
John Hines (boxer) (1912–1966), American boxer
John Hines (NASCAR owner) (fl. 1960s), former NASCAR race car owner

Others
John Hines (missionary) (1850–1931), English missionary working in Canada
Johnny Hines (1895–1970), American actor
John E. Hines (1910–1997), Episcopal bishop in America
John Hines (Wyoming politician) (born 1936), State Senator
John Hines (Mississippi politician) (born 1966), member of the Mississippi House of Representatives

See also
John Hine (disambiguation)
John Heinz (1938–1991), American businessman and politician